Bulleringa is a rural locality in the Shire of Mareeba, Queensland, Australia.

Geography
Dickson Creek, a tributary of the Lynd River, flows through from south to north.

References 

Shire of Mareeba
Localities in Queensland